The Sri Lanka A cricket team toured West Indies to play three first-class matches and three limited-overs matches against the West Indies A. Sri Lanka A is captained by Dhananjaya de Silva.

Squads

Test Series

1st Unofficial Test

2nd Unofficial Test

3rd Unofficial Test

ODI Series

1st Unofficial ODI

2nd Unofficial ODI

3rd Unofficial ODI

References 

A team cricket
2017 in West Indian cricket